Leverage: Redemption is an American action crime drama television revival of Leverage with most of the main cast returning. The first eight episodes premiered on Freevee on July 9, 2021, with an additional eight episodes released on October 8, 2021. In December 2021, the series was renewed for a second season. The second season began airing on November 15, 2022.

Premise
A year after the death of Nate Ford, his widow, Sophie Devereaux, reunites with their former crew: Eliot Spencer, Alec Hardison, and Parker. They meet Harry Wilson, a crooked lawyer searching for redemption, and help him to con one of his amoral clients. After the job, Harry convinces the team to stick together and return to "picking up where the law leaves off" while he tries to return to the side of good. The team is also joined by Hardison's foster sister, Breanna Casey, who takes Hardison's place on the crew while Hardison works with a dozen subsidiary Leverage operations and various pro-democracy and non-profit organizations around the world. The team opens a new Leverage Consulting office in New Orleans and continues working to take down rich criminals and help those who need their particular brand of justice.

Cast

Main
Gina Bellman as Sophie Devereaux - the team's grifter and, following the death of her husband Nate, their new mastermind. Still struggling in the wake of Nate's passing, she finds new purpose by leading the team.
Christian Kane as Eliot Spencer - the team's hitter. Since the ending of the original series, Eliot has spent his spare time working with veterans and giving them jobs with his food truck chain, Brick & Basil. His food trucks also serve as mobile command centers for the team's jobs.
Beth Riesgraf as Parker - the team's thief and former mastermind following Nate and Sophie's retirement. Having become bored with the managerial duties of running the various Leverage teams around the world, she happily cedes the mastermind role to Sophie to return to being a thief, though she still does grifting roles in the jobs when necessary. She is still romantically involved with Hardison and has also taken on the role of mentoring Breanna in Hardison's absence.
Aleyse Shannon as Breanna Casey - Hardison's foster sister and the team's new hacker and tech master. Though not as skilled a hacker as her brother, she is a gifted engineer with a talent for physical builds. She also desires to learn other skills from the team, having grown up on the stories of their exploits.
Noah Wyle as Harry Wilson - a former lawyer for the kinds of shady people the team targets until his wife and daughter left him because of his work. He now seeks to redeem himself and become the kind of man his daughter can be proud of.

Recurring
Andrea Navedo as U.S. Marshal Maria Shipp - a no nonsense law enforcement officer whose assignments occasionally bring her into contact with the team. She begins a romantic relationship with Eliot.
Lucy Taylor as Bligh - a high ranking member of RIZ, a private security company that engages in clandestine operations around the world and who the Leverage team sometimes encounters on their jobs. Their firm were among Harry's former clients.

Special guest star
Aldis Hodge as Alec Hardison - the team's original hacker. Since the ending of the original series, he has lent his technical skills to various pro-democracy and humanitarian organizations around the globe. With Eliot's encouragement, Hardison continues his work, as he is uniquely qualified to do so, and leaves his role to his foster sister, Breanna, though he still returns to assist the team from time to time. He maintains his romantic relationship with Parker.
 Hodge's appearances in both seasons were reduced to accommodate his shooting schedule for City on a Hill and Black Adam.

Guest stars
LeVar Burton as Mr. Blanche - a small town librarian who is actually a former intelligence agent who went into hiding 30 years previously.
Drew Powell as Jack Hurley - a former accountant and previous mark of the team who later befriended them and joined one of their crews. Hurley relates to Harry as they are both seeking redemption for their pasts.
Keith David as Billy Spencer - Eliot's estranged adoptive father. He and Eliot fell out after Eliot joined the military, causing Eliot to miss his mother's funeral. The two reunite when the team helps him stop a fracking operation that threatens his town.

Reception 
Leverage: Redemption Season 1 holds a 93 percent rating on Rotten Tomatoes, based on 15 reviews.  The critics' consensus for the first season reads: “An exciting new chapter in a beloved series, Leverage: Redemption captures the fun of the original run while giving its characters room to grow.” As of December 25, 2022, Rotten Tomatoes has gathered one review for the second season, a rave from Nina Metz of the Chicago Tribune, who observes: “The show is built around a delicious premise: Heists with a wink — and a heart. Has someone been wronged by a rich person who is plundering and destroying people’s lives in order to pad out their net worth? Then the Leverage team will swoop in with an elaborate caper while cracking wise. The goal? Karmic justice. The schemes are implausible but that’s embedded in the show’s lighthearted approach.”

Series overview

Episodes

Season 1 (2021) 
<onlyinclude>

Season 2 (2022–23)

Production

Development
On April 22, 2020, IMDb TV announced that a 13-episode revival of the series had been ordered to be broadcast on its streaming service, the now-called Amazon Freevee. Dean Devlin, who served as executive producer on the original series, returned as executive producer for the revival alongside original series creators John Rogers and Chris Downey, who served as consulting producers and writers. Marc Roskin, Rachel Olschan-Wilson, and Kate Rorick are executive producers. Plans included Noah Wyle directing two episodes of the series and Beth Riesgraf also directing one, although Wyle wound up directing three and Beth Riesgraf two. Filming began August 10, 2020 in New Orleans and had wrapped as of March 2021. On April 5, 2021, Bellman tweeted that 16 episodes had been produced, up from the original 13. On December 9, 2021, IMDb TV renewed the series for a second season.

Casting
On April 22, 2020, IMDb announced that four of the original cast members would be returning with Beth Riesgraf, Gina Bellman, and Christian Kane in main roles and Aldis Hodge with a recurring role. Noah Wyle was announced as a new character; the only original cast member not returning for the revival would be Timothy Hutton, following rape allegations.  In August 2020, it was announced that Aleyse Shannon was joining the cast as a series regular appearing as Breanna Casey, a hacker who grew up with the same foster mother as Hardison. In March 2021, it was announced James Marsters would be guest starring in the series.

Release
The series was released in two parts, with the first eight episodes of the series premiering on IMDb TV on July 9, 2021, and the remaining eight episodes released on October 8, 2021. In Canada, the series airs on CTV Drama Channel.

Lawsuit 
In February 2022, Timothy Hutton, who played Nathan "Nate" Ford in the original Leverage series, sued producer Electric Entertainment for breach of contract, claiming he was unfairly omitted from participating in the revival of the drama series after he was accused of a 1983 sexual assault in Canada, a claim that was eventually dismissed by prosecutors. This in turn led to a countersuit by the producers, who accused him of purposely withholding an attempt to settle with a victim in order to try and stop a story about the accusations from leaking out near the time of contract negotiations, which would surely have stopped him from being offered a role due to it being a violation of the morals clause in his contract; the producers alleged that the allegations surfaced two weeks after principal term negotiations with Hutton had been completed, while Hutton disputed the idea that the clause existed.

References

External links

2021 American television series debuts
2020s American crime drama television series
American action television series
American sequel television series
Crime thriller television series
English-language television shows
Fraud in television
Heist fiction
Redemption
Television shows set in New Orleans
Television shows filmed in New Orleans
Television series by Amazon Studios
Works about computer hacking